"Make Up Bag" is the second single by American R&B artist The-Dream from his third studio album Love King. The song was officially released as a single on June 8, 2010, to the iTunes Store. It features rapper T.I.

Music video
The Little X-directed music video premiered on BET's 106 & Park on June 3, 2010. Actor Jason Weaver appears in the video, as does model Selita Ebanks, who lip-synchs to a recording of the song Why Don't You Do Right?.

Charts

Radio and release information

Radio adds

Purchaseable release

References

2010 singles
The-Dream songs
T.I. songs
Songs written by T.I.
2010 songs
Songs written by The-Dream
Def Jam Recordings singles